Pectinatus frisingensis is a species of anaerobic, Gram-negative, rod-shaped bacteria first isolated from spoilt beer.

References

Further reading

External links

LPSN
Type strain of Pectinatus frisingensis at BacDive -  the Bacterial Diversity Metadatabase

Veillonellaceae
Bacteria described in 1990